A Eulogy for the Damned is the seventh studio album by British stoner metal band Orange Goblin. It was released by Candlelight Records in 2012.

Reception 

Metal Hammer allowed a guest to write a review of the album, who stated: "Many bands that try their hand at stoner rock/metal fall into the trap of being... well, boring. Orange Goblin are not one of these bands!"

Track listing 
"Red Tide Rising" – 4:49
"Stand for Something" – 3:47
"Acid Trial" – 4:13
"The Filthy & the Few" – 3:32
"Save Me from Myself" – 5:58
"The Fog" – 6:45
"Return to Mars" – 2:26
"Death of Aquarius" – 5:48
"The Bishops Wolf" – 4:39
"A Eulogy for the Damned" – 7:17

Personnel 
 Ben Ward  – lead vocals
 Joe Hoare  – guitar, keyboards
 Martyn Millard  – bass
 Christopher Turner  – drums, percussion
 Lee Dorrian – guest vocals on "Return to Mars"

Chart positions

References 

2012 albums
Orange Goblin albums
Candlelight Records albums